James Michael Burgess (July 21, 1953 – January 18, 1993) was a disco record producer and New York DJ of the 1970s. He was openly gay.

He remixed and produced numerous disco versions of popular songs, with a number of them being million sellers. His most successful and best known production was Alicia Bridges' I Love the Nightlife, which has become a "Disco standard". First released in 1978, it went to number five on the Billboard charts, and was given a new lease of life with its use in the 1994 film The Adventures of Priscilla, Queen of the Desert. Other successful productions included:
Rod Stewart's Da Ya Think I'm Sexy?
The Doobie Brothers' What a Fool Believes (12" disco remix version) and
Madleen Kane's Fire In My Heart and Secret Love Affair

He was also a popular DJ at several New York clubs (including The Saint) and was "one of the most influential remixers for the disco era".

Early years

Burgess was born on July 21, 1953 in Okeechobee, Florida. He trained as a classical tenor and opera singer, and was described as having "an amazing ear". He began his career as a DJ in Florida in the early-mid 1970s and then moved onto Limelight, a gay club in Atlanta, Georgia, where he was "discovered" by Tony Martino and Alan Harris, the owners of the New York club 12 West.

New York

Burgess subsequently returned to New York where he played at "all the hottest clubs like 12 West, Infinity, the Saint, Underground, Studio 54, Paradise Garage, as well as playing the Ice Palace in Fire Island". He had been one of the initial three resident DJs at the Saint along with Alan Dodd and Roy Thode, from its opening on 20 September 1980.

Burgess's popularity was attributed not only to his style and technique, but a love for theatrical effects and elements, which developed from his love of opera. He would frequently create his own "sound scenes" by using the dialogue from well-known films over the break of a record - as well as accentuating the effect through long mixes and sophisticated blending.

Burgess chose to end his career at age 28 with a farewell party at The Saint on 31 January 1981. During the party, he walked out at the peak of the night and let the record run out. Nevertheless, he still did continue to perform in a few infrequent gigs in New York, and started playing regularly at The Saint again in 1986. His last gig according to his partner was at The Ice Palace in 1989.

Philadelphia

After commuting back and forth from New York to Philadelphia, in 1987 he made a permanent move to pursue his first ambition, opera singing. In studied voice in Philadelphia at the Curtis Institute of Music, and sang with the Opera Company of Philadelphia and the Rittenhouse Opera Society - appearing as Florestan in Beethoven's "Fidelio" at the Lake George Opera Festival in New York and as Siegfried and Parsifal with the Liederkranz Society of New York, which awarded him first prize in its Wagner Competition in 1987.

Death

Although he was never formally diagnosed with AIDS, Burgess took ill soon after Labor Day in 1992. It was then that he was informed of his HIV status. His illness progressed very quickly and he died of Progressive multifocal leukoencephalopathy, an AIDS-related opportunistic infection four months after taking ill, on 18 January 1993 at his home in Philadelphia. He was survived by his partner, Martin Dillon, his sister, Dawn Burgess-Krop of Gainesville, Fl, and his brother, Jonathan, of Asheville, N.C.

Discography

Remixes
Some of the more notable singles that Burgess was involved in the remixing and/or production of are:

External links
 https://web.archive.org/web/20110522110211/http://www.djhistory.com/forum/showthread.php?p=273735
 http://gayhistory.wikispaces.com/Burgess,+Jim
 https://query.nytimes.com/gst/fullpage.html?res=9F0CE3DB103DF936A15752C0A965958260
 https://archive.today/20130122155122/http://www.discomusic.com/people-more/1556_0_11_0_C/
 http://www.discomusicpeople-more/45_0_11_0_C/ John Celiga interview

Further reading
Love saves the day: A History of American Dance Music Culture 1970-79, Tim Lawrence, 2003, Duke University
Last Night a Dj Saved My Life: The History of the Disc Jockey, Bill Brewster & Frank Broughton, Grove Press, 2000

References and notes

American disco musicians
American DJs
LGBT DJs
Businesspeople from New York City
American audio engineers
Remixers
Record producers from New York (state)
American LGBT musicians
1953 births
1993 deaths
20th-century American businesspeople
People from Okeechobee, Florida
Engineers from New York City
20th-century American engineers
20th-century American LGBT people